Schenk is a Jewish (Ashkenazic) and German occupational surname derived from schenken (to pour out or serve) referring to the medieval profession of cup-bearer or wine server (later also to tavern keeper). At one time, only Jews were allowed to sell alcohol in the Russian empire, which is why Shenk (Russian) and its later surname variants are very common. People with this surname include:

 Ard Schenk (born 1944), Dutch speed skater (see also: Ard Schenk Award)
 August Schenk (1815–1891), German botanist and paleobotanist
 Beatrice Schenk de Regniers (1914–2000), American children's writer and illustrator
 Bel Schenk (born 1975), Australian poet
 Bert Schenk (born 1970), German boxer
 Berthold von Schenk (1895–1974), American Lutheran pastor
 Charles Schenk Bradley (1853–1929), American electrical engineer, inventor, pioneer of early electric motors
 Christian Schenk (born 1965), East German decathlete
 Dieter Schenk (born 1937), German author and police officer  
 Francis Joseph Schenk (1901–1969), American prelate of the Roman Catholic Church
 Franziska Schenk (born 1974), German speed skater
 Fritz Schenk (1930-2006), German journalist
 Georg Schenk von Limpurg, (1470–1522), Prince-Bishop of Bamberg
 Gretchen Knief Schenk (1901–1989), American librarian
 Hanne Schenk (born 1984), Swiss bobsledder
 Hans Schenk (athlete) (1936-2006), German javelin thrower
 Hans Schenk (economist), Dutch economist
 Heinz Schenk (1924-2014), German television moderator
 Henk Schenk (born 1945), Dutch-born American wrestler
 Isobel Schenk (1898–1980), Australian Christian missionary
 Jakob Schenk (1921-1951), Swiss cyclist
 Johan Schenk (1660 – after 1712), Dutch musician and composer
 Johann Baptist Schenk (1753–1836), Austrian composer
 Josephus Schenk (born 1980), Dutch darts player
 Juliane Schenk (born 1982), German badminton player
 Juraj Schenk (born 1948), Slovak government minister
 Karl Schenk (1823–1895), Swiss pastor and politician
 Leopold Schenk (1840–1902), Austrian embryologist
 Lynn Schenk (born 1945), American (Californian) politician
 Nick Schenk (born 1965), American screenwriter
 Otto Schenk (born 1930), Austrian actor
 Pavel Schenk (born 1941), Czech volleyball player 
 Peter Schenk the Elder (1660–1712), German-born Dutch engraver and cartographer
 Peter Schenk the Younger (1693–1775), Dutch engraver and map publisher
 Rodolphe Samuel Schenk (1888–1969), Australian Christian missionary
 Xandro Schenk (born 1993), Dutch footballer
Schenk von Stauffenberg 
 Claus Schenk von Stauffenberg (1907–1944), German army officer, aristocrat and resistance member
 For his relatives, see the Stauffenberg family

See also
Schenck
Schenks, Squamish village in British Columbia
Shenk
Shank (disambiguation)

References

Dutch-language surnames
German-language surnames